We Are Many may refer to:

 We Are Many (film) about the 2003 protests against the impending Iraq War
 We Are Many, an arts and environment project/festival in Saskatoon, Canada